Văn Lâm is a rural district (huyện) of Hưng Yên province in the Red River Delta region of Vietnam. As of 2003 the district had a population of 97,238. The district covers an area of 74 km². The district capital lies at Như Quỳnh.

References

Districts of Hưng Yên province